The Men's Combined in the 2019 FIS Alpine Skiing World Cup involved two events. The only skier to podium in both was Alexis Pinturault of France, who edged out overall World Cup leader Marcel Hirscher for the title in the second race and thus won the season championship. At this time, combined races were not included in the season finals, which were scheduled in 2019 in Soldeu, Andorra.

The season was interrupted by the 2019 World Ski Championships, which were held from 4–17 February in Åre, Sweden. The men's combined was held on 11 February.

Standings

DNS = Did Not Start
DNS2 = Finished run 1; Did Not Start run 2
DNF1 = Did Not Finish run 1
DNF2 = Did Not Finish run 2

See also
 2019 Alpine Skiing World Cup – Men's summary rankings
 2019 Alpine Skiing World Cup – Men's Overall
 2019 Alpine Skiing World Cup – Men's Downhill
 2019 Alpine Skiing World Cup – Men's Super-G
 2019 Alpine Skiing World Cup – Men's Giant Slalom
 2019 Alpine Skiing World Cup – Men's Slalom
 World Cup scoring system

References

External links
 Alpine Skiing at FIS website

Men's Combined
FIS Alpine Ski World Cup men's combined discipline titles